Pseudosphex pelopia is a moth of the subfamily Arctiinae. It was described by Herbert Druce in 1897. It is found in Panama and Bolivia.

References

Pseudosphex
Moths described in 1897